The SexBomb Girls (also known as SB Girls, SBG, SexBomb Dancers, and now SB NewGen) is an all-female singing and dancing group in the Philippines. They were initially only dancers for Eat Bulaga!, the midday variety show in the Philippines, then later branched into singing and acting, as well as dancing.

The group had also become one of the best-selling girl groups in Asia from 1999 to 2009 prior to the rise of K-pop.

History

The SexBomb Dancers were originally composed of four dancers upon their formation in November 1999 (Rochelle, Che-che, Debra, and Janine) under the name Chicken Sandwich Dancers as the background dancers of Eat Bulaga! and an offshoot of the Danz Focus Dancers (house dancers of the said show). The name "Sex Bomb" came from the 1999 hit song of Tom Jones. Of the four, only Rochelle remained (thus landing her the role and title as the group leader) until the group expanded during the SexBomb dance searches in 2000–2001, reaching an all-time high of 26 members. In 2002, the SexBomb Singers were formed and were billed as "SexBomb Girls" in their shows and promotional materials. Their first studio album, Unang Putok included the hit songs "Bakit Papa?" ("Why Daddy?"), "Crush Kita", "Pretty Little Baby", "Di Ko Na Mapipigilan" ("I Can No Longer Stop") and "Tulog Na Baby" ("Sleep Now Baby"). In 2003, they released their sophomore album entitled Round 2 which featured the hit song "Spageti Song (Pababa nang Pababa) featuring Joey de Leon. In 2004, the SexBomb Girls released their third album entitled Bomb Thr3at featuring the song "Halukay Ube". The SexBomb Dancers did show and danced to songs from their dance albums, Sexiest Hits (2002), Sexiest Hits 2 (2003) and Sexiest Hits 3 (2004). The SexBomb Singers and Dancers were then collectively referred to as The SexBomb Girls. The SexBomb Girls were managed by Joy Cancio, of Focus Entertainment. Cancio was a former member of the Vicor Dancers of the 1980s.

The group's fame continued to permeate with the said album releases, constant national television show guests, live shows in political campaigns and comedy bars, and their longest drama series on Philippine television, Daisy Siete that ended in July 2010, extending to 26 seasons (a total of almost 7 years). Upon the group's dismissal from their house show Eat Bulaga! in 2011, the SexBomb Girls became freelance and appeared in GMA, ABS-CBN and TV5, while maintaining outside shows. In December 2013, the original members of the dance group went their separate ways.

The group has performed in night shows and concerts at The Library in Malate, Manila, Joketime in Pasay and Cavite, Oblivion Bar and Longue, Dutdutan Tattoo Conventions by Tribal Philippines, Yamaha Philippines, and at Zirkoh and Klownz in Quezon City every week, and also traveled across the country to host festivals, special occasions, and requested town event guestings.

The SexBomb Girls are managed by Jara Cancio, the daughter of Joy Cancio, and Aira Bermudez (original SexBomb Dancer). The group is known as SexBomb NewGen or SB NewGen to represent the new generation of the SexBomb Girls, producing all-female talents with expertise in dance genres such as hip-hop, contemporary and urban, as well as in singing, slowly deviating from the original group's main focus on novelty and jazz.

According to PARI, Sexbomb Girls is the best selling girl group of the decade (2000s) in the Philippines by selling over 12 million sales (4 studio albums, 4 compilation albums and Christmas singles)

As of August 4, 2017, it was announced that SB NewGen would be co-managed in unison by J Entertainment and Viva Artists Agency.

In 2023, Sexbomb Dancers are reunited when an online streaming giant announced their new subscription rate in a new advert featuring members Rochelle Pangilinan, Jopay Paguia, Che-che Tolentino, Sunshine Garcia, Mia Pangyarihan, and Johlan Veluz. They reprised ‘The Spageti Song’ with new lyrics advertising the online streaming giant lowering their rate for all devices.

Current members
SB NewGen

Nikkie Millares (2017–present)
Eunice Andrea Creus (2018–present)
Jelai Ahamil (2019–present)
Jade Rodriquez (2022–present)
Raine Tolentino (2023–present)
Audrey Abalos (2023–present)

Former members

Original SexBomb Girls
Rochelle Pangilinan-Solinap (1999–2011) 
Debbie 'Debra' Ignacio                              (1999–2001) 
Cheryl 'Che-Che' Genove-Shimabukuro                 (1999–2000)
Janine Reyes-Ramos                                  (1999–2000)
Aira Bermudez                                   (2000–2017)
Jopay Paguia-Zamora                                    (2000–2010, 2012–2014)
Mia Pangyarihan                                     (2000–2013)
Cherrie Nhorren Ingal                               (2000)
Jayne Lao-Ng                                        (2000–2002)
Michelle Reyes                                      (2001–2002)
Izzy Trazona-Aragon                                 (2001, 2002–2010)
JB Cifra-Cuellar                                    (2000–2001)
Yvette Lopez                                        (2001) 
Mae Acosta-Valdes                                   (2001–2005, 2007-2013) 
Grace Nera                                          (2001–2013)
Sandy Tolentino                                     (2001–2005, 2007-2014) 
Che-Che Tolentino                                   (2001–2014)
Weng Ibarra                                         (2001–2007, 2008–2010) 
Evette Pabalan-Onayan                               (2001–2007, 2008-2010)
Natalie 'Babat' Imperial-Baron                      (2002)
Sugar Mercado                                   (2002, 2004–2006)
Aba 'AB' Chiongson                                  (2002)
Jacky Rivas                                         (2002–2010, 2012, 2014–2016)
Sunshine Garcia-Castro                              (2001, 2003-2013)
Monique Icban-Diamante                              (2002-2005, 2008–2010)          
Johlan Veluz                                        (2002–2013)
Cynthia 'CY' Yapchingco                             (2003–2010)
Jacquelline Esteves-Tran                            (2002, 2003–2006)
Nimfa Rafidi                                        (2002)
Aifha Medina-Cheng                                  (2003–2010) 
Jhoana Orbeta                                       (2003–2005, 2007-2012)
Mariam Al-Obaidi                                    (2003-2004)
Rodellyn 'Joice' Pecho                              (2004–2005)
Jovel Palomo                                        (2004–2009)
Danielle Ramirez–Hartmann                           (2004–2010)
Louise Bolton                                       (2004–2016) 
Mhyca Bautista                                      (2004–2014)
Cherry Ann Rufo                                     (2004–2007)
Molly Baylon                                        (2006)
Hazel Taligatos-Burgos                              (2006–2007) 
Kate Sacay                                          (2006–2007) 
Danica Gulapa-Habib                                 (2006–2012)
Kristel "Kryz" Moreno (2007)
Charm Saldon-Jamarolin                              (2007)
Alice Almocera-Jackson                              (2007)
Michelle Mercado                                    (2007–2009)
Shane Gonzales-Ignacio                              (2007–2010)
Sheena Flores-de Castro                             (2008–2011)
Jomarie Gutierrez-Olaes                             (2009–2014)
Stephanie Lantion                                   (2009)
Jaja Barro                                          (2010–2014)
Dona Veliganio                                      (2010–2016)
Yui Guiterrez                                       (2010–2011)
Julie Anne Septimo-Ihap                             (2010–2013)
Trizia Ramis                                        (2012–2014)
Krizia Ramis                                        (2012–2014)
Kristine Saludo-De Vera                             (2012–2013)
Kristine 'Joyz' Decena                              (2012–2013)
Jane Albarracin                                     (2012–2013)
Emilou Malabayabas                                  (2013)

SB NewGen
Joyce Canimo                                        (2012–2016; 2018–2019)
Camille Lazo                                        (2012–2018)
Lea Jane Lumabi                                     (2014-2019, 2021-2023)
Angel Gavilan                                       (2014–2016)
Ynna Marie Bayot                                    (2014–2016)
Gera Yulo                                           (2014–2015)
Janine 'Tricia' Ravancho                            (2014–2015)
Kimberly 'Khim' Zolina                              (2014)
Daphny Red Apigo                                    (2015-2023)
Keshia Almoroto                                     (2015–2022)
Chubbie 'Chachi' Bardon                             (2015–2016)
Erika Grulla                                        (2015–2016)
Julie May Aring                                     (2016–2022)
Nerizza 'Nerz' Germina                              (2016–2017)
Janaira 'Rai' Martinez                              (2017–2018)
Charlie Carpio                                      (2017)

Discography

The first attempt of creating a singing compartment for SexBomb occurred in 2001 with Rochelle Pangilinan (the group leader), Jopay Paguia (nicknamed as the Pambansang Hita), Evette Pabalan (discovered in 2001 Eat Bulaga! singing contest, impersonating Alanis Morissette), Weng Ibarra, Izzy Trazona, Sugar Mercado, and Aibee Chiongson. However, due to Aibee's departure from the group, this first attempt dissolved quickly.

The official line-up of the SexBomb Singers (officially named as the SexBomb Girls) debuted in 2002 with the successful release of their first album, Unang Putok, that garnered a 4× Platinum award: Rochelle, Jopay, Evette, Weng, Izzy, and Monique Icban (newest member auditioned for the Singers). 2002 marked the first categorical division of the group: the SexBomb Girls (SexBomb Singers) (led by Rochelle) and the SexBomb Dancers (led by Aira Bermudez).

2004 was a year of new and young SexBomb members (for both Singers and Dancers) pulled from Eat Bulaga! auditions and private  screenings. Half-Filipina, half-Egyptian Mariam Al-Obaidi was added to the SexBomb Singers roster, with a debut in the 2× Platinum album Bomb Thr3at. After a few months, Al-Obaidi left the group and was seen in the rival show Wowowee (ABS-CBN) as the newest ASF Dancer. Around the same time, Original SexBomb Singer Monique Icban left the group (returning later in 2008). Later in 2004, new members Danielle Ramirez and Jovel Palomo were joined to form a singing duo, separate from the Singers division, as DJ Bomb in which they released songs such as Kaibigan and Kutob.
In 2005, SexBomb Dancer Che-che Tolentino was introduced as the newest SexBomb Singer as a replacement for past members Monique and Mariam. She was debuted in the last ever studio album, Sumayaw, Sumunod: The Best of the Sexbomb Girls.

Due to several group disputes and near break-up issues, little was done by the SexBomb Singers (besides political campaigns and outside shows) until 2010 for the last season of Daisy Siete. In honor of the noontime drama series, a singing sub-group named Daisies was formed with their debut single Take One for the soundtrack album of the last season of Daisy Siete, Adam or Eve. The Daisies composed of the five youngest members of SexBomb, each having their own color: Louise Bolton (Daisy Green), Mhyca Bautista (Daisy Blue), Che-che Tolentino (Daisy Yellow, replacing Shane Gonzales), Jomarie Gutierrez (Daisy Lavender), and Jaja Barro (Daisy Pink). With the final departure of the frontliners of the dance group such as Rochelle and Jopay in 2011, the grand champion of Danz Showdown: The Search for the Next SexBomb Girls Dona Veliganio was added to the Daisies as Daisy Red. The Daisies re-covered DJ Bomb's songs such as Kutob.

In 2012, the Daisies were no longer onset and an official set of vocalists named the New Generation SexBomb Singers composed of Louise, Jomarie, Jaja and Dona.

Upon Jomarie and Jaja's departure from the group in 2014, the SexBomb Girls were re-launched under a new company, J Entertainment, as the NewGen SexBomb Girls with three separate compartments: SexBomb NewGen (performed in national television), SexBomb Dancers (performed in outside shows), and SexBomb GKiss (the singers). SexBomb GKiss was initially composed of Louise Bolton, Dona Veliganio, and Joyce Canimo, but was later augmented in early 2015 with former Original Mocha Girl: Hershey Delas Alas and with back-up SexBomb Dancers Jacky Rivas, Ynna Bayot, and Angel Gavilan.

Upon the departure of Louise, Jacky, Dona, Joyce, Ynna, Angel, and Hershey in late 2015, the current line-up of the NewGen SexBomb Girls (now formally known as SexBomb NewGen) was established. Though no singing compartment is currently on the air, NewGen leader Jane Lumabi and hip-hopper Nerizza Germina stand as SB NewGen's singers in their shows starting December 2016.

With Nerizza leaving in 2017 for the Mocha Girls, named 'Singing Princess' Eunice Andrea was added to the SB NewGen roster in early 2018 to stand as the lead singer of the girl group in mall tours and daily shows.

In February 2019, SB NewGen released their first self-composed single in their music video entitled "Want U" featuring Michael "Cursebox" Negapatan under Viva Records and Cursebox Productions.

Studio albums
2002: Unang Putok (4× Platinum)
2003: Round 2 (5× Platinum)
2004: Bomb Thr3at (2× Platinum)
2005: Sumayaw, Sumunod: The Best of the Sexbomb Girls (Platinum)
2007: Itaktak mo at iba pang Pasaway na Hits (With various artists)

Christmas albums
2002: Wish Ko sa Pasko (Gold)
2003: Spaghetti Sa Pasko (single)
2004: Pik-piripik-pik ng Pik-Pik (single)

Dance compilation albums
The songs on these albums are performed mostly by European Eurodance artists. The choreography to the songs on these albums was popularized by the Sexbomb Dancers. Mall shows were held nationwide to promote these albums.

2002: Sexbomb's Sexiest Hits (Gold)  
2002: Sexbomb: I Like & Other Hits (Gold)
2003: Sexbomb's Sexiest Hits: 2 (Gold)
2004: Sexbomb's Sexiest Hits: 3 (4× Platinum)

Compilation albums
2006: Daisy Siete: V-DAY Music from the TV Series
2007: Tabachingching: Sexbomb
2008: Vaklushii: Daisy Siete Season 19 Soundtrack
2010: Adam or Eve

Solo albums
2005: Jacque Estevez (Gold)
2007: ROC: Rocaholic (Gold)

SB NewGen
2019: Single Want U (850,000 YouTube views)
2019: Single Newgen Shake (800,000 YouTube views)
2020: Single Halo Halo (290,000 YouTube views)

Acting career

The Sexbomb Girls have their own movie, Bakit Papa, which was released nationwide in the Philippines in 2002. The Sexbomb Singers took the lead, with the Dancers playing support. Others in the cast include Allan K., Wendell Ramos, Epi Quizon, Chynna Ortaleza and Richard Gutierrez. It was produced by Regal Films and had an opening day of P3.5 million, with the total box-office sales estimated at P20.6 million.

The group had their own afternoon drama series Daisy Siete, which aired on GMA Network weekdays at 2:30 pm.

Daisy Siete had been a rating mogul since its premiere, charting its highest rating at 30% in December 2003 (season 1). It later rated anywhere from 19% to 25%. Rival networks tried to compete by airing their own shows; some of these shows were Colgate Trip Kita, Sarah the Teen Princess and Kapamilya Cinema.

From 2002 to 2003, the girls were also part of Daboy en Da Girl, with Rochelle as Britney, and the girls as Japayukis.

The girls have appeared on different guestings on the GMA Network. Magpakailanman has featured the life stories of several Sexbomb Girls with them playing themselves: Sunshine Garcia, Jacque Estevez, Aira Bermudez, Evette Pabalan, Johlan Veluz and Aifha Medina. Rochelle Pangilinan's story was played by Rufa Mae Quinto. Pangilinan has portrayed other characters twice, and Bermudez played the Aeta featured in one episode.

The Sexbomb Dancers were mainstays on QTV Channel 11's Let's Get Aww! which aired last November 2005. The show was short-lived.

Aira was part of the cast in afternoon drama series Dragon Lady she portrays as Janine Gutierrez's assistant her catchphrase is "Get Get Out" instead of "Get Get Aww".

Filmography

Television

2002: Daboy en Da Girl (Aira, Jopay, Natalie, Rochelle, Evette)
2003–2010: Daisy Siete
2004: Love to Love (Jacque, Jopay)
2005: Darna (Rochelle, Jacque)
2005: Etheria: Ang Ikalimang Kaharian ng Encantadia (Jopay)
2006: Encantadia: Pag-ibig Hanggang Wakas (Jopay)
2007–2008: Tok! Tok! Tok! Isang Milyon Pasok! 
2009: Adik Sa'Yo (Rochelle)
2009: Show Me Da Manny (Rochelle)
2009: Darna (Rochelle, Cynthia, Mia, Sandy)
2010: Diva (Rochelle)
2010: Pilyang Kerubin (Sunshine)
2010: Smile TV (Cheche, Johlan)
2011: Amaya (Rochelle, Mia)
2012: Luv U (Trizia, Krizia, Camille)
2012: Broken Vow (Rochelle)
2013: Be Careful With My Heart (Jopay)
2013–present: Magpakailanman (Rochelle)
2013: My Husband's Lover (Mia)
2014: The Ryzza Mae Show (Rochelle, Jopay, Che-che)
2014: Marian (Rochelle, Johlan, Aira, Weng, Sandy, Mia, Louise, Che-Che, Evette)
2014: Carmela (Rochelle)
2014: Ang Lihim ni Annasandra (Rochelle)
2015: Luv U (Camille)
2015: Bridges of Love (Jopay, Janine, Angel)
2016: Kapuso Mo, Jessica Soho (Cheche)
2016: That's My Amboy (Mia)
2016: Tubig at Langis (Jopay)
2016: The Millionaire's Wife (Louise)
2016: The Story of Us (Kristel Moreno)
2016: Encantadia 2016 (Rochelle, Cheche, NewGen Jane, Camille)
2016: Banana Sundae Angelica Birthday (Jopay, Mia, Cheche, Louise)
2017: A Love to Last (NewGen Julie)
2017: Haplos (Mia, Cheche, Johlan, Cynthia, Aira, Louise)
2018: Lip Sync Battle Philippines (Joy Cancio, Rochelle, Aira, Cheche, NewGen)
2019: Inagaw na Bituin (Cheche, Sandy, Mia)
2019: Dragon Lady (Aira)
2019: World of Dance Philippines
2021: Wowowin (Aira)
2021-2022: The World Between Us (Mia)
Various Year: Mars Pa More (Rochelle, Izzy, Mia, Sandy, Che-che, Aira, Mycha, Johlan, Jopay)

Film
2001: Tusong Twesome (Debra) 
2002: Bakit Papa (Sexbomb Girls
2002: Bertud ng Putik (Rochelle)
2002: Lastikman (Jopay) 
2004: Anak ka ng Tatay Mo (Cynthia) (Jomar)
2004: Fantastikman (Jopay, Grace, Rochelle, Jacky, Cynthia)
2004: Enteng Kabisote (Aira)
2005: Ispiritista (Aifha, Cynthia, Sugar, Danielle, Jovel) 
2005: Enteng Kabisote 2 (Louise, Mhyca, Cherry Ann) 
2008: Iskul Bukol 20 Years After (Ungasis and Escaleras Adventure) (Aira)
2011: Panday 2 (Jhoana, Jomarie)
2019: Indak (film) (SB NewGen)

Music videos
The girls starred in the music video for "Askal" in 2013, sung by Jose Manalo and Wally Bayola, and the song entry for the second Philippine Popular Music Festival.

Joyce Canimo of the NewGen SexBomb Girls starred in the official music video for "Sa'Yo" in 2014, sung by Silent Sanctuary.

The NewGen SexBomb Girls starred in the official dance music video for "Kinikilig" in 2016, sung by Hazel Faith as choreographed by Joy and daughter Jara Cancio.

Lea Jane of SexBomb NewGen starred as the demoness in the official music video for "Apoy" in 2018, by rapper Abra.

Daphny and Eunice of SB NewGen starred in "Di Lahat" music video by Donnalyn Bartolome.

Awards and recognitions

Awards
Guillermo Mendoza Memorial Scholarship Foundation, Inc. Awards:
2007: "Hall of Famer" - Sexbomb Dancers
2002–2008: "Most Popular Dance Group" - Sexbomb Dancers

YouTube:
2018: "Silver Play Button Award" - SB NewGen (400,000 subscribers)

References

External links
  Official Facebook Page
 http://entertainment.mb.com.ph/2017/01/02/still-the-bomb/ Manila Bulletin Entertainment

Musical groups established in 1999
Filipino girl groups
Filipino pop music groups
Musical groups from Quezon City
Filipino dance groups
1999 establishments in the Philippines
GMA Network personalities